Crataegus pseudoheterophylla is a species of hawthorn found in Anatolia, the Transcaucasus, Iran and Afghanistan. They are trees or shrubs that are typically found on scrubby mountain slopes.

Subspecies
A number of subspecies have been proposed:
Crataegus pseudoheterophylla subsp. pseudoheterophylla autonym
Crataegus pseudoheterophylla subsp. turcomanica (Pojark.) K.I.Chr. found in Iran and Turkmenistan
Crataegus pseudoheterophylla subsp. turkestanica (Pojark.) K.I.Chr. found in Iran, Central Asia, and Afghanistan

References

pseudoheterophylla
Plants described in 1939